Howard Milton Girling (24 May 1922 – 7 January 1992) was an English professional footballer who played as an outside forward in the Football League for Brentford, Crystal Palace and Bournemouth & Boscombe Athletic.

Club career

Crystal Palace 
An outside forward, Girling signed for Crystal Palace in 1942, during the Second World War. After hostilities ceased in 1945, he made 27 appearances and scored six goals for the Third Division South club before departing in February 1947.

Brentford 
Girling moved up the pyramid to rejoin First Division strugglers Brentford in February 1947, for whom he had previously guested during the Second World War. He made 15 appearances in what remained of the 1946–47 season and was unable to help the club from relegation to the Second Division. He established himself in the team in the 1947–48 season, making 35 appearances. His appearance-count reduced over the next two seasons, so much so that he spent 1950–51 in the reserves, before leaving Griffin Park at the end of that season. Girling made 90 appearances and scored 10 goals in four years with Brentford.

Bournemouth & Boscombe Athletic 
In July 1951, Girling dropped down to the Third Division South to join Bournemouth & Boscombe Athletic for a short spell.

Hastings United 
Girling dropped into non-League football and ended his career with Southern League club Hastings United. A highlight of his time with the Us were two runs to the third round proper of the FA Cup.

Career statistics

References

1922 births
English footballers
Crystal Palace F.C. players
English Football League players
Brentford F.C. players
Footballers from Birmingham, West Midlands
Brentford F.C. wartime guest players
AFC Bournemouth players
Hastings United F.C. (1948) players
Southern Football League players
1992 deaths
Southport F.C. wartime guest players
Association football outside forwards